Thierry Soumagne (born 17 October 1953) is a Belgian fencer. He competed at the 1976, 1980, 1984 and 1988 Summer Olympics.

References

External links
 

1953 births
Living people
Belgian male fencers
Belgian épée fencers
Belgian foil fencers
Olympic fencers of Belgium
Fencers at the 1976 Summer Olympics
Fencers at the 1980 Summer Olympics
Fencers at the 1984 Summer Olympics
Fencers at the 1988 Summer Olympics
People from Uccle
Sportspeople from Brussels